Nicolae "Nicu" Stoian (born February 17, 1957) is a Romanian former volleyball player who competed in the 1980 Summer Olympics.

He was born in Râmnicu Sărat.

In 1980 he was part of the Romanian team which won the bronze medal in the Olympic tournament. He played all six matches.

External links
 
 

1957 births
Living people
People from Râmnicu Sărat
Romanian men's volleyball players
Olympic volleyball players of Romania
Volleyball players at the 1980 Summer Olympics
Olympic bronze medalists for Romania
Olympic medalists in volleyball
Medalists at the 1980 Summer Olympics